Barrows Green is a village in Cumbria, England.

External links

Villages in Cumbria
Stainton, South Lakeland